Simon Seibert (September 12, 1857 Buffalo, Erie County, New York – 1917) was an American politician from New York.

Life
He attended the public schools. In 1893, he became a clerk in the City Treasurer's office.

Seibert was a member of the New York State Assembly (Erie Co., 2nd D.) in 1894 and 1895.

He was a member of the New York State Senate (48th D.) from 1896 to 1898, sitting in the 119th, 120th and 121st New York State Legislatures.

He was an alternate delegate to the 1896 Republican National Convention; and a delegate to the 1900 Republican National Convention.

Seibert was a presidential elector in the 1904 presidential election.

He was buried at the Forest Lawn Cemetery, Buffalo.

References

Sources
 The New York Red Book compiled by Edgar L. Murlin (published by James B. Lyon, Albany NY, 1897; pg. 169, 404 and 511)
 Sketches of the members of the Legislature in The Evening Journal Almanac (1895; pg. 54)
 VOTE OF NEW YORK SPLIT in NYT on March 15, 1896
 NEW YORK'S DELEGATION in NYT on June 11, 1900

External links

1857 births
1917 deaths
Republican Party New York (state) state senators
Politicians from Buffalo, New York
Republican Party members of the New York State Assembly
Burials at Forest Lawn Cemetery (Buffalo)
19th-century American politicians
1904 United States presidential electors